LY-235959 is a competitive antagonist at the NMDA receptor. It has analgesic and neuroprotective effects and causes hypothermia in animal models, as well as reducing the development of tolerance to morphine and altering the reinforcing effects of cocaine.

References 

NMDA receptor antagonists
Phosphonic acids
Decahydroisoquinolines